Crary may refer to:

People
Albert P. Crary, polar geophysicist and glaciologist
Alice Crary, moral philosopher
Isaac E. Crary, U.S. Representative from Michigan
John Crary (ca. 1784-1848), New York politician
Jonathan Crary, art critic and essayist
Scott Crary (born 1978), American film director, producer and writer
William Crary Brownell, American essayist and art critic

Places
Crary Mountains, a group of Antarctic mountains
Crary, North Dakota, a city in Ramsey County
Craryville, New York, a hamlet in Columbia County

Other uses
Albert P. Crary Science and Engineering Center, polar laboratorium at McMurdo Station
Crary Ice Rise, an Antarctic ice rise